The Office of the Managing Director (MDO) is responsible for the coordination and administration of a
variety of City services and supervising several City operating departments and functions, including the
Office of Innovation and Technology, the Records Department, Department of Public Property, Office of
Human Resources, Office of Fleet Management, Procurement Department, Center of Excellence and the
311 Contact Center. These tasks are accomplished by prioritizing and communicating key administrative
initiatives, monitoring and analyzing the department’s performance and progress, and by serving as a
catalyst to encourage cooperation and collaboration. In addition, this office is responsible for organizing
and supervising major interdepartmental initiatives and special events.

References

External links
Managing Director's Office Organizational Chart
Brian Abernathy

Government of Philadelphia